Lance Dement (born September 20, 1968) is an American sports shooter. He competed in the men's 10 metre running target event at the 2000 Summer Olympics.

References

External links
 

1968 births
Living people
American male sport shooters
Olympic shooters of the United States
Shooters at the 2000 Summer Olympics
Sportspeople from Hawaii